Arvind Sastry is an Indian film director, screenwriter and an editor in Kannada cinema.

He started his career with "Kahi (Bitter)", an independent Kannada movie which was released in November 2016.

Early life
Arvind was born in Bengaluru district in Karnataka on 22 May 1990. He is an alumnus of Manipal Institute of Technology (I&P Engineering). Then, he pursued his post-graduate studies in screenplay writing and film direction at Ramoji Academy of Film and Television, Hyderabad before making Kahi.

Career
In 2016, Arvind stepped into Kannada film industry with the independent film, "Kahi". The film garnered rave reviews and went on to win the Karnataka State Film Award for Best Original Screenplay making Arvind the youngest ever recipient of the award. Kahi was one of the Kannada films to be streamed on Netflix. 

In 2017, Arvind started work on his second directorial venture, a film named Alidu Ulidavaru. The film's story was written by Sudheer Shanbogue while Arvind wrote the screenplay. The film had its theatrical release in December 2019. The film generated largely positive reviews and went on to complete 100 days of theatrical run.
In November 2019, Arvind began work on his third film. The film is titled "Vaitarani" and stars Sathish Ninasam and Sharmiela Mandre in lead roles. The shooting for the film's first schedule took place in London. The rest of the film is set to be shot in Karnataka. In June 2020, the film was renamed as "Dasara". The film was shot in between COVID-19 lockdowns and its production was completed in September 2021.

Awards
Arvind Sastry won the award for the Best Original Screenplay at the Karnataka State Film Award for Best Screenplay for "Kahi".

References

Kannada film directors
Living people
1990 births
Film directors from Bangalore
Film producers from Bangalore
Screenwriters from Bangalore
Kannada screenwriters